Barker is a village in Niagara County, New York. The population was 533 at the time of the 2010 census. The mail ZIP code is 14012. It is part of the Buffalo–Niagara Falls Metropolitan Statistical Area.

Barker is within the Town of Somerset and was incorporated in 1908. The main crossroad in the town is the intersection of West Somerset Road and Quaker Road (NY 148).

Geography
Barker is located at  (43.327466, -78.553592).

Barker is situated at the junction of West Somerset Road/Coleman Road and Quaker Road (Route 148).

Demographics

As of the census of 2000, there were 577 people, 211 households, and 150 families residing in the village. The population density was 1,372.3 people per square mile (530.4/km). There were 234 housing units at an average density of 556.5 per square mile (215.1/km). The racial makeup of the village was 98.09% White, 0.69% African American, 0.52% Native American, 0.17% from other races, and 0.52% from two or more races. Hispanic or Latino of any race were 1.56% of the population.

There were 211 households, out of which 38.4% had children under the age of 18 living with them, 54.0% were married couples living together, 10.4% had a female householder with no husband present, and 28.9% were non-families. 24.6% of all households were made up of individuals, and 13.7% had someone living alone who was 65 years of age or older. The average household size was 2.73 and the average family size was 3.19.

In the village, the population was spread out, with 30.3% under the age of 18, 8.1% from 18 to 24, 26.3% from 25 to 44, 21.8% from 45 to 64, and 13.3% who were 65 years of age or older. The median age was 36 years. For every 100 females, there were 99.0 males. For every 100 females age 18 and over, there were 93.3 males.

The median income for a household in the village was $37,411, and the median income for a family was $49,464. Males had a median income of $41,875 versus $21,375 for females. The per capita income for the village was $16,042. About 8.1% of families and 9.6% of the population were below the poverty line, including 11.0% of those under age 18 and 7.6% of those age 65 or over.

References

External links
Village of Barker official website

Villages in New York (state)
Buffalo–Niagara Falls metropolitan area
Villages in Niagara County, New York